Kanazawa University (abbreviated to ) is a Japanese national university in the city of Kanazawa, the capital of Ishikawa Prefecture. Founded in 1862, it was chartered as a university in 1949.

Kanazawa University is divided into two main campuses: Kakuma and Takaramachi. University enrollment is about 10,100 students, including 636 international students in 2021.

History 

The university was founded in 1862 as an institution for smallpox vaccination (種痘 所, Shutō-sho ) called  which was established by the Kaga Domain. In 1876 it became a medical school from Ishikawa Prefecture. In 1887 it became the Medical Faculty of the State Fourth Higher Middle School (第四 高等 中 学校 医学 部, Dai-shi kōtō chūgakkō igakubu ) and then in 1894 to the Medical Faculty of the State Fourth High School (第四 高等学校 医学 部, Dai-shi kōtō gakkō igakubu ).

In 1901 it developed into the Kanazawa Medical College (Kanazawa Medical College, Kanazawa igaku semmon gakkō) and then in 1923 to the Kanazawa Medical University (Kanazawa Medical University, Kanazawa ika daigaku).

The prefectural and municipal governments wanted to keep Kanazawa Imperial University (the Medical School as their medical faculty); the state university was not realized before the Pacific War.

 - founded in 1874
 - founded in 1887
 - founded in 1918
 - 1920
 - founded in 1944

Since then, Kanazawa University has been the leader of universities on the Sea of Japan. It has continuously and substantially contributed to the development of higher education in Japan as well as global promotion of research by offering undergraduate and graduate courses.

The former main building of the Fourth High School (built 1891), became The Fourth High School Memorial Museum of Cultural Exchange (石川四高記念文化交流館).

The main campus of Kanazawa University was first located in the former Kanazawa Castle. In 1989 the larger Kakuma campus was opened and in 1994 the headquarters moved to the new campus.

Timeline
1949-Kanazawa University was established with Kanazawa Medical University, Fourth High School, Kanazawa Higher Normal School, Kanazawa Technical College, Ishikawa Normal School, and Ishikawa Youth Normal School as the parent body. There are 6 faculties: Faculty of Law, Faculty of Education, Faculty of Science, Faculty of Medicine, Faculty of Pharmacy, and Faculty of Engineering.
1968-The Tuberculosis Research Institute and the Cancer Research Facility attached to the Faculty of Medicine are integrated and the Cancer Research Institute is established.
1974-Established Medical Technology Junior College.
1980-Faculty of Law and Literature is separated and reorganized into Faculty of Letters, Faculty of Law, and Faculty of Economics.
1989-Faculty of Letters, Law, and Economics move to Kakuma district.
1992-Faculty of Education and Faculty of Science move to Kakuma district.
1993-The Ministry of Liberal Arts moves to the Kakuma district.
1994—The secretariat relocated to the Kakuma district, and the relocation from the castle district to the Kakuma district was completed.
1995—Established the Department of Health Sciences, and moved the attached kindergarten, elementary school, and junior high school to the Heiwacho district.
2004-Opened Law School.
2005-Faculty of Pharmacy and Engineering move to Kakuma district.
2006—Transferred the Faculty of Pharmacy Department of Pharmacy to a 6-year system (the Department of Comprehensive Pharmacy was abolished) and established the Department of Pharmacy Science, a 4-year department.
2007—Completed the complete renovation work of the attached high school.
2008—Reorganized all 8 faculties into 3 faculties and 16 faculties. Implementation of the Acanthus Scholarship System (Kanazawa University's unique benefit-type scholarship system for those with excellent grades).
2010-Acanthus scholarship system abolished. We are planning to implement a new system that expands the scope of benefits as a "student special support system".
2012–150 years since its foundation.
2016-Transition from 2 semesters to 4 semesters.
2018—Announced cancellation of classes for the first time in 8 years (3044 days) due to heavy snowfall.

Basic data

Location
Kakuma Campus ( Kakuma Town, Kanazawa City, Ishikawa Prefecture)
Takaramachi Campus (Takaramachi, Kanazawa City, Ishikawa Prefecture)
Tsuruma Campus ( Kodatsuno, Kanazawa City, Ishikawa Prefecture )
Heiwamachi district (Heiwamachi, Kanazawa City, Ishikawa Prefecture)
Higashikenroku district (Higashikenrokucho, Kanazawa City, Ishikawa Prefecture)
Tatsunokuchi district (Nomi City, Ishikawa Prefecture )
Kanazawa University Tokyo Office (Nihonbashi Muromachi, Chuo-ku, Tokyo)

Emblem
The emblem of Kanazawa University shows the characters for "university" and the leaves of the acanthus, a Mediterranean plant. It was first used in August 1949. The acanthus stands for "The Fine Arts," and its graceful leaves were loved by the ancient Greeks and Romans who used them as decorations in the capitals of Corinthian and composite columns. It is said that they were grown in the garden of Plato's Akademia.
Navy blue is used as the school color . In RGB (28,50,77).
Thistle is the symbol of the Acanthus Portal, which is an e-learning system on campus.
In novels and dramas, it is sometimes metaphorized under the fictitious names "Noto University" and "Ishikawa University".

Organization

Faculties (former undergraduate programs) 
Kanazawa University has eight faculties (学部).

Faculty of Literature (文学部)
Faculty of Education (教育学部)
Faculty of Law (法学部)
Faculty of Economics (経済学部)
Faculty of Science (理学部)
Faculty of Engineering (工学部)
Faculty of Medicine (医学部)
Faculty of Pharmaceutical Sciences (薬学部)

Colleges (undergraduate programs) 
Kanazawa University has three colleges (学域) and 16 schools (学類) for undergraduate programs.
College of Human and Social Sciences (人間社会学域)
School of Humanities (人文学類)
School of Law (法学類)
School of Economics (経済学類)
School of Teacher Education (学校教育学類)
School of Regional Development Studies (地域創造学類)
School of International Studies (国際学類)
College of Science and Engineering (理工学域)
School of Mathematics and Physics (数物科学類)
School of Chemistry (物質化学類)
School of Mechanical Engineering (機械工学類)
School of Electrical and Computer Engineering (電子情報学類)
School of Environmental Design (環境デザイン学類)
School of Natural System (自然システム学類)
College of Medical, Pharmaceutical and Health Sciences (医薬保健学域)
School of Medicine (医学類)
School of Pharmacy (薬学類)
School of Pharmaceutical Sciences (創薬科学類)
School of Health Sciences (保健学類)

Graduate schools 
Graduate School of Education (大学院教育学研究科)
Graduate School of Human and Socio-Environment Studies (大学院人間社会環境研究科)
Law School (大学院法務研究科)
Graduate School of Natural Science and Technology (大学院自然科学研究科)
Graduate School of Medical Science (大学院医学系研究科)

Research facilities 
University Libraries (附属図書館)
Central Library (中央図書館)
Natural Science and Technology Library (自然科学系図書館)
Medical Branch Library (医学系分館)
University Hospital (附属病院)
Cancer Research Institute (がん研究所)

Campuses

Kakuma Campus 
College of Human and Social Sciences
Humanities, Law, Economics, Teacher Education, Regional Development Studies, International Studies
College of Science and Engineering
Mathematics and Physics, Chemistry, Mechanical Engineering, Electrical and Computer Engineering, Environmental Design
College of Medical, Pharmaceutical and Health Sciences
Pharmacy, Pharmaceutical Sciences

Takaramachi Tsuruma Campus 
College of Medical, Pharmaceutical and Health Sciences
Medicine, Health Sciences

Heiwamachi Campus 
Experimental school attached to the College of Human and Social Sciences
Kanazawa University High School

Notable alumni 
Tatsuma Ejiri (1975-), a manga artist
Kohei Eto (1982-), a basketball coach
Yoshio Koide (1942-), a theoretical physicist
Ryoji Nakagawa (1939-), a member of the Supreme Court of Japan
Yoshihisa Okumura (1926-2023), an engineer
Han Qing-quan (1884-1921), a Chinese doctor
Bunji Sakita (1930-2002), a theoretical physicist
Mikito Takayasu (1860-1938), an ophthalmologist

Points of interest 
 Botanic Garden, Faculty of Science, Kanazawa University

Gallery (Kakuma Campus)

Note

References

External links

Kanazawa University website 
Kanazawa University website 
 Kanazawa University Youtube Official Channel 

 
Educational institutions established in 1949
Kanazawa
Japanese national universities
Universities and colleges in Ishikawa Prefecture
1949 establishments in Japan
American football in Japan